The MG L-type is a sports car that was produced by the MG Car company in 1933 and 1934.  

This 2-door sports car used a smaller version of the 6-cylinder overhead camshaft, crossflow engine which now had a capacity of 1086 cc with a bore of 57 mm and stroke of 71 mm and produced  at 5500 rpm. It was previously fitted in the 1930 Wolseley Hornet and the 1931 MG F-type Magna. Drive was to the rear wheels through a four-speed non-synchromesh gearbox. The chassis was a narrower version of that used in the K-type with suspension by half-elliptic springs all round with rigid front and rear axles.  

The car had a wheelbase of 94 inches (2388 mm) and a track of 42 inches (1067 mm). 
 
The brakes, which were larger than in the J2, were cable-operated, with  drums all round.

The body kept the sloping radiator seen on the F-Type, but the car now had sweeping wings, and had cut-away doors. The body tubs of the L2 and J2 are practically identical rear of the bonnet.

The L1 was the four-seat, coupé and saloon version and the L2 the 2-seater. The coupé, or Continental Coupé as it was called, was available in some very striking two-tone colours but was a slow seller, and the 100 that were made were available for a long time after the rest of the range had sold out. As a rarity, it is now a highly desirable car. The bodies for the small saloon or salonette version were not made by MG, but bought in from Abbey.

The L-Type was a successful competition car, with victories in the 1933 Alpine Trial and Brooklands relay race.

When new, a L1 tourer cost £299 and a Continental Coupé £350.

References
 MG Sportscars. Malcolm Green. CLB International. 1997 
 A-Z of Cars of the 1930s. Michael Sedgwick and Mark Gillies. Bay View Books. 1989. 

L
Cars introduced in 1933